Gerald Aliseni (born 29 February 1988) is a Zimbabwe cricketer, who played for Mashonaland in first-class and List A cricket and the Southerners in Twenty20 cricket.

References

External links
Gerald Aliseni

1988 births
Living people
Zimbabwean cricketers